Héroe may refer to one of the following songs:

 "Héroe", the Spanish version of Mariah Carey's song "Hero"
 "Héroe", the Spanish version of Enrique Iglesias's song "Hero"

See also 
 Héroes (disambiguation)